Clusiodes is a genus of flies in the family Clusiidae. There are at least 70 described species in Clusiodes.

Species
These 70 species belong to the genus Clusiodes:

 Clusiodes aberrans Frey, 1928
 Clusiodes albimanus (Meigen, 1830)
 Clusiodes americanus Malloch, 1922
 Clusiodes angulosus Sueyoshi, 2006
 Clusiodes apicalis (Zetterstedt, 1848)
 Clusiodes apiculatus Malloch, 1922
 Clusiodes argutus McAlpine, 1960
 Clusiodes ater Melander & Argo, 1924
 Clusiodes atra Melander & Argo
 Clusiodes bisetosa Mamaev, 1974
 Clusiodes bismarckensis Sasakawa, 1974
 Clusiodes caestus Caloren & Marshall, 1998
 Clusiodes caledonicus Collin, 1912
 Clusiodes chaetostylotis Sasakawa, 1987
 Clusiodes clandestinus Caloren & Marshall, 1998
 Clusiodes clarus McAlpine, 1960
 Clusiodes coconino Caloren & Marshall, 1998
 Clusiodes dasytus Sasakawa, 1987
 Clusiodes discostylus Sueyoshi, 2006
 Clusiodes eremnos Caloren & Marshall, 1998
 Clusiodes femoratus Sasakawa, 1987
 Clusiodes flaveolus Mamaev, 1974
 Clusiodes formosana Hennig, 1938
 Clusiodes freyi Tuomikoski, 1933
 Clusiodes gentilis Collin, 1912
 Clusiodes geomyzinus (Fallen, 1823)
 Clusiodes gladiator McAlpine, 1960
 Clusiodes gracilolobus Caloren & Marshall, 1998
 Clusiodes iotoides Sasakawa, 1990
 Clusiodes johnsoni Malloch, 1922
 Clusiodes kinetrolicros Caloren & Marshall, 1998
 Clusiodes leptapodemus Caloren & Marshall, 1998
 Clusiodes leucopeza Frey, 1960
 Clusiodes marginalis Sasakawa, 1987
 Clusiodes megaspilos McAlpine, 1960
 Clusiodes megastylotis Sasakawa, 1987
 Clusiodes melanospilus Sasakawa, 1987
 Clusiodes melanostoma (Loew, 1922)
 Clusiodes melanostomus Loew, 1864
 Clusiodes microcerca Stackelberg, 1955
 Clusiodes microcerus Stackelberg, 1955
 Clusiodes mirabilis Frey, 1928
 Clusiodes napo Caloren & Marshall, 1998
 Clusiodes niger Melander & Argo, 1924
 Clusiodes nigra Melander & Argo
 Clusiodes nigriceps McAlpine, 1960
 Clusiodes nigrifrons Frey, 1960
 Clusiodes nitidus Melander & Argo, 1924
 Clusiodes notatus Sasakawa, 1987
 Clusiodes nubila Meigen, 1830
 Clusiodes obscuripennis Frey, 1960
 Clusiodes orbitalis Malloch, 1922
 Clusiodes phrenzinus Caloren & Marshall, 1998
 Clusiodes pictipes (Zetterstedt, 1855)
 Clusiodes plumipes Sasakawa, 1987
 Clusiodes plumosus Sasakawa, 1964
 Clusiodes pterygion Caloren & Marshall, 1998
 Clusiodes punctifrons Frey, 1960
 Clusiodes quatuorsetosa Mamaev, 1974
 Clusiodes ruficollis (Meigen, 1830)
 Clusiodes saopaulo Caloren & Marshall, 1998
 Clusiodes spinos Caloren & Marshall, 1998
 Clusiodes stimulator Caloren & Marshall, 1998
 Clusiodes terminalis Melander & Argo, 1924
 Clusiodes tobi Sueyoshi, 2006
 Clusiodes tuomikoskii Mamaev, 1974
 Clusiodes unica Mamaev, 1974
 Clusiodes usikumuri Sueyoshi, 2006
 Clusiodes verticalis Collin, 1912
 † Clusiodes petreficata Statz, 1940

References

Further reading

External links

 

Schizophora genera
Articles created by Qbugbot
Clusiidae